The British First World War cavalry generals, by the end of the war belonged to one of the smallest arms of the British Army, they did however, including those belonging to the British Indian Army, provided some of its highest ranking commanders.

The cavalry were well represented among the British Army's higher ranks, with five of the ten officers who would command the five armies on the Western Front being cavalrymen. In the British Army the term "cavalry" was only used for regular army units. The other mounted regiments in the army, which were part of the Territorial Force reserve, were the yeomanry and special reserve regiments of horse. However the yeomanry formations were commanded by cavalry or ex-cavalry officers.

The two commanders of the British Expeditionary Force during the First World War, Field Marshals John French and Douglas Haig, came from the 19th (Queen Alexandra's Own Royal) Hussars and 7th (Queen's Own) Hussars respectively. William Robertson, 3rd (Prince of Wales's) Dragoon Guards, who rose in rank from private to field marshal, was the Quartermaster General, then Chief of Staff of the British Expeditionary Force, before becoming the Chief of the Imperial General Staff in December 1915.

Edmund Allenby, 6th (Inniskilling) Dragoons, who started the war as the commander of the Cavalry Division, went on to command the Cavalry Corps, then V Corps, the Third Army, and the Egyptian Expeditionary Force. He was replaced as commander of the Third Army by Julian Byng, 10th (Prince of Wales's Own) Royal Hussars who had previously commanded the Canadian Corps. Hubert Gough of the 16th (The Queen's) Lancers, known before the war for his involvement in the Curragh incident mutiny, started the war as a brigade commander, became the commander of the I Corps, then the Fifth Army. He was replaced by William Birdwood, 12th (Prince of Wales's) Royal Lancers, who had previously commanded the Australian and New Zealand Army Corps during the Gallipoli Campaign. Charles Briggs, 1st (King's) Dragoon Guards, commanded the British Salonika Army. William Peyton, 15th (The King's) Hussars, commanded the Western Desert Force during the Senussi Campaign. He later transferred to the Western Front, where he was temporarily commander of the Fifth Army before taking over command of the X Corps.

Cavalry generals

See also
British Army during World War I

References
Footnotes

Citations

 
Generals